Solbus is a Polish bus manufacturer founded in 2001 in Solec Kujawski. It has been described as one of the "major players in Poland's automotive industry". In 2005 it accounted for 20% of bus production in Poland, and was named by the business daily Puls Biznesu as the best company and one of the three fastest growing companies in the Kuyavian-Pomeranian Voivodeship. Currently it produces approximately 100-150 buses a year.

Products - buses
Actual offer:
 Tourist coaches
 Solbus Soltour ST10
 Solbus Soltour ST11
 Intercity buses
 Solbus Soltour ST10/I
 Solbus Soltour ST11/I
 Solbus Solway SL10
 Solbus Solway SL11
 Local buses
 Solbus Solcity SN11L
 City buses
 Solbus Solcity SN11M
 Solbus Solcity SM12
 Solbus Solcity SM12 CNG
 Solbus Solcity SM12 LNG
 Solbus Solcity SM18 - new
 Solbus Solcity SM18 LNG - new

Historical buses:
 Tourist coaches
 Solbus LH 9,5
 Solbus C 10,5/1
 Intercity buses
 Solbus C 9,5
 Solbus C 10,5
 City buses
 Solbus B 9,5

External links

 Company homepage
 webarchiv solbus.com.pl

References

Bus manufacturers of Poland
Polish brands
Polish Limited Liability Companies